During the 1980–81 English football season, Arsenal F.C. competed in the Football League First Division.

Season summary

After the gruelling and heart breaking 70-match season in 1979/80, it was clear that Arsenal needed reinforcements if they wanted to progress to the next level, and it was essential that the money earned from their cup runs should be invested in the squad. Arsenal only received the maximum £600,000 allowed by UEFA and the EEC for international transfers when Liam Brady went to Juventus.

With the impending departure of Brady, Arsenal fans were in need of some positives, so the signing of Clive Allen at least provided a glimmer of hope.
The 19-year-old centre forward was one of the most exciting prospects in the English game. After scoring 28 goals for QPR in the Second Division in 1979/80 Arsenal signed the teenager to provide competition and assistance to Frank Stapleton and Alan Sunderland. Arsenal had smashed their transfer record, spending £1.25 million on Allen, completely blitzing their previous high of £440,000 on Brian Talbot in the process. 

Clive Allen's Arsenal career was over after just 62 days at the club. Allen, who played just three pre-season games for Arsenal, headed to Crystal Palace along with goalkeeper Paul Barron. In return England defender Kenny Sansom arrived at Highbury. Arsenal also bought defensive midfielder Peter Nicholas from Crystal Palace in March 1981. He joined Arsenal when the club had won a grand total of three of the last 14 games played. After that Arsenal played nine, and only dropped two points and Nicholas didn’t play on the losing side. When he joined  Arsenal they were 7th, eleven points behind the leaders. By the end of the season Arsenal were 3rd, seven points behind the leaders, and qualified for the UEFA cup. Arsenal had gone through the whole season undefeated at Highbury in the League, and were undefeated in their final nine matches.

Pre-season and friendlies

Results

First Division

Football League Cup

FA Cup

Arsenal entered the FA Cup in the third round proper, in which they were drawn to face Everton.

Squad

Top scorers

First Division
  Frank Stapleton 14
  Alan Sunderland 7
  Brian Talbot 7

References

Arsenal
Arsenal F.C. seasons